H18 may refer to :
 British NVC community H18, a heath in the British National Vegetation Classification system
 , an H-class submarine ordered by but never commissioned into the Royal Navy
 , a Royal Navy S-class destroyer
 London Buses routes H18, a Transport for London contracted bus route
 Sikorsky H-18, an American helicopter
 Tomakomai Station, in Hokkaido, Japan